Holly Herndon (born 1980) is an American composer, musician, sound artist and sound designer based in Berlin, Germany. After studying composition at Stanford University and completing her Ph.D. at Stanford University's Center for Computer Research in Music and Acoustics, she pursued a music career internationally. Herndon's music often includes human singing voices (including her own), is primarily computer-based, and regularly uses the visual programming language Max/MSP to create custom instruments and vocal processes. She has released music on the labels RVNG Intl. and 4AD. Her most recent full-length album, Proto, was released on May 10, 2019.

Biography

Early life 
Holly Herndon was born in 1980 and raised in Johnson City, Tennessee. As a teenager, she spent several years living in Berlin on a high school exchange program, absorbed in the city's dance and techno scene. When Herndon returned to the United States she began studying electronic music at Mills College in Oakland, California. She studied under John Bischoff, James Fei, Maggi Payne, and Fred Frith, receiving her MFA in Electronic Music and Recording Media. While at Mills she composed the vocal-generated piece 195, which won her the Elizabeth Mills Crothers award for best composer in 2010. At school she focused on laptop performance, and she currently does most of her composing via laptop. In 2011 she released Car, an independent, near hour-long track on cassette.

Movement (2012) 
While attending Mills she began developing her debut album Movement. Movement was released in November 2012 through RVNG Intl, a record label based in Brooklyn. For the album she used the visual programming language Max/MSP to create custom instruments and vocal processes.

Movement received a score of 8.1 on Pitchfork, who stated that Herndon "uses her crystalline voice as a chief input for her laptop, ultimately arriving at a poignant nexus of electronic accessibility and experimentation that owes as much to her academic forebears as her club contemporaries. It's a record with the rare capacity to turn cynics who might scoff at the idea of laptops-as-intimate-instruments into believers."

According to The Quietus, "Movements sound certainly has its forebears and contemporaries – it's possible to detect traces of everyone from Coil and Aphex Twin to Ellen Allien and Laurel Halo in the mix – but equally it contains elements, both sonic and thematic, that are quite unlike any other electronic music currently out there." Also, "Herndon's music reflects the ambiguous nature of our interactions with these technologies. It's by turns sensual, blissful and disturbing, and often hints towards all three states at once."

Touring, exhibitions 
She toured internationally after the release, also taking part in a number of artistic collaborations such as projects with Iranian writer Reza Negarestani, Chicago producer Jlin, and Hieroglyphic Being. Her collaboration with Conrad Shawcross was exhibited at the Palais de Tokyo in Paris. She played the CTM Festival on January 31, 2013, in Berlin. As of late 2012 she was a doctoral candidate in composition at Stanford University. At Stanford she continued to use coding software such as Max/MSP to program many of her own electronic instruments and patches.

Chorus (2014) 
Her single "Chorus" was released on January 24, 2014, with a music video created by Akihiko Taniguchi. "Chorus" was named Best New Track by Pitchfork. For sounds to build the song, Herndon sampled her browsing experience on the internet, incorporating sources such as YouTube and Skype. The video focuses explicitly on the personal nature of modern computing. According to Herndon, "The more comfortable we get with these devices, the more vulnerable we are. We are learning more and more about the NSA revelations; I think it is really interesting that we have never been more intimate with these machines, and at the same time have never had such cause to be suspicious of them. We wanted to capture both of those sides."

The full Chorus EP was also released in January both on vinyl and digitally, and it received an 8.0 and positive review in Pitchfork. According to Create Digital Music, "few artists have managed to meld the dark thump of techno with the intricate constructions of post-minimalist new music quite like Holly Herndon. Her rapid-punctuated, ethereal vocals... float above complex, dance music-inspired machinery, producing an effect that is arrestingly gorgeous and frightening all at once."

Home (2014) 
Herndon released the single "Home" on September 16, 2014, with a video directed by Dutch design studio Metahaven. According to Herndon, it captures her feeling of losing trust in electronics after the revelations the NSA monitors what some Americans do online. "Home" continues "Chorus"'s theme of surveillance: "It is a love song for prying eyes (an agent / a critic), and also a break up song with the devices with which I shared a naive relationship."

Platform (2015) 
Herndon's second full-length album, Platform, was released on May 19, 2015. The album explores a complicated relationship with technology, and includes a track titled "Lonely at the Top" that is intended to trigger Autonomous sensory meridian response (ASMR).

Proto (2019) 
Herndon's third full-length album, Proto, was released on May 10, 2019. In this collaborative work with her partner Mathew Dryhurst and programmer Jules LaPlace, she involved a singing AI that she had developed over the course of several years.

Teaching 
Herndon has taught, held lectures, and performed workshops within the framework of conferences, festivals, academies, and mentorship programs, such as Forecast in Berlin.

Discography

Studio albums

Singles

Compositions 
2010: 195 (winner of the Elizabeth Mills Crothers award for best composition 2010)
2013: BodySound: Solo Duet with Cuahtemoc Peranda
2013: ADA with Conrad Shawcross
2013: Being There with TILT Brass

Collaborations, other 
2009: Score Generating Vocal Network Piece
2009: Mills Improvisation Ensemble
2010: +Dialog
2011: CCM
2011: CCM Artist in Residency Series
2012: <body> with Mathew Dryhurst
2012: Collusion with Reza Negarestani & Mathew Dryhurst
2013: C.回.R with Mathew Dryhurst - hackathon
2013: K回IRO with Mathew Dryhurst - exhibit
2014: Call with Mathew Dryhurst and Metahaven

Music Videos 
"Interference" (2015)
"Morning Sun" (2015)
"Godmother" (2018)
"Eternal" (2019)

See also 
List of 21st-century classical composers

References

Further reading 
Interviews
First Listen: Holly Herndon, 'Movement' (NPR, November 2012)
Computer Love: An Interview With Holly Herndon (November 2012)
Speaking in Code (Factmag, November 2012)
Gatekeeper select Holly Herndon (Dazed Digital, 2013)
It's A Body Thing: An Interview With Holly Herndon (The Quietus, December 2012 )
CTM 2013: Holly Herndon Q&A (Wire, February 2013)
Continuous Partial Listening: Holly Herndon in Conversation (Rhizome, January 2014)
Input/Output: Holly Herndon (Ableton, February 2014)

External links 
 

Living people
American women composers
Practitioners of autonomous sensory meridian response
21st-century American composers
American electronic musicians
American experimental musicians
Singer-songwriters from Tennessee
People from Johnson City, Tennessee
American women singer-songwriters
Record producers from California
Musicians from San Francisco
American women in electronic music
Singer-songwriters from California
1980 births
Mills College alumni
21st-century American singers
21st-century American women singers
American women record producers
American expatriates in Germany
21st-century women composers
Women sound artists